S&D often refers to the Progressive Alliance of Socialists and Democrats. It may also refer to:
Search and destroy, refers to a military strategy that became a notorious component of the Vietnam War
Silver & Deming, a type of reduced-shank drill bits
Somerset & Dorset Joint Railway, was an English railway line
Speech and Debate
Spybot – Search & Destroy, a popular spyware and adware removal program compatible with Microsoft Windows 95 and later
Supply and demand, an economic model of price determination in a market

See also
D&S (disambiguation)